SCC may refer to:

Companies
 Secure Computing Corporation
 SCC (Specialist Computer Centres), British-based IT consulting company
 Southern Copper Corporation, a mining company operating in Central and South America

Computing
 Scenarist Closed captioning file
 Small, Cheap Computer, a small, subnotebook computer
 Source Control Plug-in API, also known as SCC API or Microsoft Source Code Control Interface (MSSCCI)
 Serial Communication Controller
 Single-chip Cloud Computer, Intel's 48-core research chip
 Strongly connected component in graph theory

Conferences
 Suncoast Conference
 South Central Conference (disambiguation)
 South Coast Conference (disambiguation)
 Southern Comfort Conference, an annual transgender conference

Medicine
 Sickle cell crisis, an episode of pain in sickle-cell disease
 Short-course chemotherapy, chemotherapy of short duration
 Small-cell carcinoma, a form of cancer that most commonly arises in the lung
 Somatic cell count, a count of cells, usually to detect mastitis and thus to assess milk quality
 Squamous-cell carcinoma, a form of cancer in squamous epithelial cells
 Spinal cord compression, undue compressive force on the spinal cord
 SCCmec, staphylococcal cassette chromosome mec
 Subgenual cingulate cortex, that is, Brodmann area 25, a part of the brain in primates
 Superior semicircular canal, one of three semicircular canals in the vestibular system, within the inner ear
 Succinylcholine

Military
 Somaliland Camel Corps, British Army unit

Organisations
 Special Criminal Court, Ireland
 Sea Cadets, UK
 Sierra Club Canada
 Singapore Cricket Club
 Singapore Cruise Centre
 Society of Cosmetic Chemists, US
 Standards Council of Canada
 Swiss Cancer Centre, in Lausanne
 Students for Concealed Carry (of firearms), US
 Society of Cannabis Clinicians
 Society of Cosmetic Chemists

Politics and government

United Kingdom
 Scottish Constitutional Convention
 Sheffield City Council, England
 Shropshire County Council, England
 Somerset County Council, England
 Southampton City Council, England
 Staffordshire County Council, England
 Suffolk County Council, England
 Surrey County Council, England
 Swansea City Council, Wales

Other
 State Corporation Commission (Virginia), American regulatory agency
 Supreme Court of Canada, highest and final court of appeal in Canada
 Santa Clara County, California, a county government in California

Schools and colleges
 Sacramento City College, in Sacramento, California, United States
 Saint Columban College, in Pagadian City, Philippines
 Salem Community College, in Carneys Point, New Jersey, United States
 Sampson Community College, in Clinton, North Carolina, United States
 Sandhills Community College, in Pinehurst, North Carolina, United States
 Santiago Canyon College, in Orange, California, United States
 Scottish Church College, an undergraduate college in Kolkata, India
 Scottsdale Community College, in Scottsdale, Arizona, United States
 Seminole Community College, in Sanford, Florida, United States
 Seton Catholic Central High School, A high school in Binghamton, New York, United States
 Sinclair Community College, in Dayton, Ohio, United States
 Shawnee Community College, in Ullin, Illinois, United States
 Sherman College of Chiropractic, in Spartanburg, South Carolina
 Solano Community College, in Fairfield, California, United States
 Somerset Community College in Somerset, Kentucky, United States
 South Cheshire College, in Crewe, Cheshire, England
 Southeast Community College, in southeastern Nebraska, United States
 Southeastern Community College (disambiguation)
 Southwestern Community College (disambiguation)
 Southern Christian College, in Kingston, Tasmania, Australia
 Southern Cross College, a Christian college in Sydney, Australia
 Spartanburg Community College in Spartanburg, South Carolina, United States
 Spokane Community College, in Spokane, Washington, United States
 St. Charles Community College, in Cottleville, Missouri, United States 
 St. Charles College, Pietermaritzburg, in Pietermaritzburg, KZN, South Africa

 Stanly Community College, in Albemarle, North Carolina, United States
 Salesian College Celbridge, in Celbridge, Co. Kildare, Ireland

Other
 Saab Car Computer; see Saab Information Display
 Deadhorse Airport, Alaska (USFAA/IATA code)
 Seattle Center Coliseum
 Self-consolidating concrete
 Social cost of carbon
 Somerset Coal Canal
 Sport Compact Car, an automobile enthusiasts periodical
 Star Chinese Channel
 Stress corrosion cracking
 Saguaro Correctional Center, a US prison
 Silesia City Center
 Standard contractual clauses, in General Data Protection Regulation